"Help" is a single by American rock band Papa Roach, from their ninth studio album Crooked Teeth. It topped the Billboard Mainstream Rock Songs chart in April 2017 for six consecutive weeks.

Background
The song was first released as a single on February 17, 2017. The song was produced by Nicholas Furlong and Colin Brittain, two younger, up-and-coming music producers the band chose to work with, to help find a new sound that mixed their Infest-era sound with more modern music. A music video for the song was released on May 1, 2017. Directed by Darren Craig, the video features the band performing and shows footage of unfortunate life events happening to a man wearing a bunny costume.

Themes and composition
Lyrically, the song's message is centered around surviving mental health issues. The song features bass-driven verses, followed by a wash of heavy guitar and synths in the chorus, with frontman Jacoby Shaddix's recurring line in the chorus singing "I think I need help / I’m drowning in myself". Rock Sound described the song as "infectious, emotional...powerful...a cry for help in musical form". Shaddix described the song:

Charts

Weekly charts

Year-end charts

Certifications

Personnel
 Jacoby Shaddix – lead vocals
 Jerry Horton – guitar
 Tobin Esperance – bass
 Tony Palermo – drums

References

Papa Roach songs
2017 songs
2017 singles
Eleven Seven Label Group singles
Songs written by Jacoby Shaddix
Songs written by Jerry Horton
Songs written by Tobin Esperance
Songs written by Nicholas Furlong (musician)
Songs written by Colin Brittain
Song recordings produced by Colin Brittain